The Murray was an electoral district of the South Australian House of Assembly , the lower house of the bicameral legislature of the then colony of South Australia.

The Murray was one of the original districts created in 1857 and abolished in 1862; part of its area was then included in Mount Barker.

Members

References

Former electoral districts of South Australia
1857 establishments in Australia
1862 disestablishments in Australia